El Aioun may refer to: 

Laayoune, Western Sahara (administered and claimed by Morocco)
El Aioun, Mauritania
El Aioun Sidi Mellouk (Morocco)
 , a commune in El Taref Province, Algeria

See also 
 Ayun (disambiguation)
 El Ayoun (disambiguation)